Dankino is a rural locality (a village) in Kisnemskoye Rural Settlement, Vashkinsky District, Vologda Oblast, Russia. The population was 11 as of 2002.

Geography 
Dankino is located 20 km northwest of Lipin Bor (the district's administrative centre) by road. Gavrilovo is the nearest rural locality.

References 

Rural localities in Vashkinsky District